"Yesterday Girl" is a song by the American alternative rock group The Smithereens. It is the third single released in support of their third album 11.

Pat DiNizio said that the music was based on Louie Louie by The Kingsmen. The song was written about the downsides to success.

Formats and track listing 
All songs written by Pat DiNizio
US cassette single (4JM-44587)
"Yesterday Girl" – 3:27
"Room Without a View" – 4:09
"Behind the Wall of Sleep (MTV Unplugged)" – 4:02

Charts

References 

1989 songs
1990 singles
Capitol Records singles
The Smithereens songs
Song recordings produced by Ed Stasium
Songs written by Pat DiNizio